Cara Sucia River is a river of El Salvador. It arises in the foothills of the El Imposible National Park and flows westward through the area of Cara Sucia in the Ahuachapán Department region to a bay near El Zapote.

References

Rivers of El Salvador